Mudiriyah (plural Mudiriyat), meaning "directorate" (from مدير mudir, meaning "director"), is an administrative subdivision also known in English as mudirate, and often translated as "province". It was used in Egypt and in Anglo-Egyptian Sudan. The term was also used in Yemen. The mudiriya were subdivided into markaz, or districts. In modern Egypt, these subdivisions were replaced by governorates (muhafazat).

Notes

See also
 States of Sudan

Former subdivisions of Egypt